Bing'ai (also romanized Bingai) is a 2007 Chinese documentary film directed and produced by Feng Yan (冯艳). It is about a peasant woman, Zhang Bing'ai, who refused to relocate during the construction of the Three Gorges Dam.

Awards
Bing'ai won the Ogawa Shinsuke Prize at the 2007 Yamagata International Documentary Film Festival. It also won First Prize at the 2008 Punto de Vista International Documentary Film Festival.

Reception
In Variety, Robert Kohler called it a "beautifully observed" documentary and a "worthy addition to the Mainland's astonishing onrush of nonfiction films that take measure of the human scale in Chinese life".

See also
Up the Yangtze, a 2007 documentary film about people affected by the building of the Three Gorges Dam

References

External links 

Chinese documentary films
2007 films
2000s Mandarin-language films
2007 documentary films
Documentary films about hydroelectricity